Norman M. Bradburn (born )  is an American social scientist and the Tiffany and Margaret Blake Distinguished Service Professor Emeritus at University of Chicago and former University Provost, and an Elected Fellow of the American Academy of Political and Social Science, American Statistical Association, and American Academy of Arts and Sciences.

In 2012, Bradburn received the Warren J. Mitofsky Award for Excellence in Public Opinion Research from the Board of Directors of the Roper Center for Public Opinion Research at Cornell University.

Education
Bradburn received his bachelor's degree from both the University of Chicago and Oxford University and went on to receive a master's and PhD in Clinical and Social Psychology (respectively) from Harvard University.

References

University of Chicago faculty
American social scientists
1933 births
Living people
Harvard Graduate School of Arts and Sciences alumni
University of Chicago alumni
Fellows of the American Statistical Association
Fellows of the American Academy of Political and Social Science
Fellows of the American Academy of Arts and Sciences